This list comprises all players who participated in at least one league match for Phoenix FC in their only season in the USL Pro. Players who were on the roster but never played a first team game are not listed; players who appeared for the team in other competitions (US Open Cup, CONCACAF Champions League, etc.) but never actually made an USL appearance are noted at the bottom of the page where appropriate.

A "†" denotes players who only appeared in a single match.

A
  Davy Armstrong

B
  Will Bates †
  Josh Bento
  Renan Boufleur
  Travis Bowen

D
  Peabo Doue

F
  Diego Faria
  Lalo Fernández †

G
  Devon Grousis

H
  Cyprian Hedrick
  Brian Holmes
  Tj Hjeltness

K
  Aaron King
  Neal Kitson

M
  Darren Mackie
  Scott Morrison

N
  Netinho

O
  Anthony Obodai

P
  Sheldon Parkinson
  David Paul

R
  José Ramos
  Thomas Ramos

S
  Isaiah Schafer
  Reid Schmitt
  Humberto Soriano †

T
  Donny Toia

V
  Roberto Valadez †
  Cameron Vickers

W
  Andrew Weber
  Elliot Weber

References

Phoenix FC
Phoenix FC
Association football player non-biographical articles